Pizzo Erra is a mountain of the Lepontine Alps, located in the Swiss canton of Ticino. It is located south of the pass of Basso di Nara, on the subrange that separates the main valley of Leventina from the valley of Blenio.

References

External links
 Pizzo Erra on Hikr

Mountains of the Alps
Mountains of Switzerland
Mountains of Ticino
Lepontine Alps